Binns may refer to:

 Binns (surname), English surname
 Binns (department store), British retailer
 Binns Hall, Virginia, United States
 House of the Binns, historic estate near Linlithgow, Scotland